Brett Dallas McClure (born February 19, 1981 in Yakima, Washington) is a retired American gymnast. He won a bronze medal in the pommel horse at the 2001 Goodwill Games in Brisbane, Australia, and later helped his U.S. gymnastics team earn a silver in the team competition at the 2004 Summer Olympics in Athens. During his sporting career, McClure has collected two more silver medals in the same program at the World Artistic Gymnastics Championships (2001 and 2003). McClure is currently the High Performance Director with USA men's gymnastics.

Early years
McClure was born in Yakima, Washington, the son of Les and Judy McClure. He started gymnastics at the age of nine under the influence of his father Les, who pushed him to train and perform ten pushups from a handstand position against the wall. When his family later resided in Mill Creek, Washington, he spent two years at Henry M. Jackson High School and finished up early at Chrysalis School in Woodinville, during which time he trained at Cascade Elite Gymnastics in Lynwood, WA. In 1999, McClure moved to Colorado Springs, Colorado to work and train as a full-time resident athlete at the U.S. Olympic Training Center, under head coach Vitaly Marinich.

Career

2001–2003
McClure made his official worldwide debut at the 2001 Goodwill Games in Brisbane, Australia, where he received an average score of 9.362 to bring home the bronze medal in the pommel horse, finishing behind China's Huang Xu and Romania's Marius Urzică. On that same year, he added a silver to his annual hardware in the men's team all-around competition (a total of 166.845) at the World Artistic Gymnastics Championships in Ghent, Belgium.

At the 2003 World Artistic Gymnastics Championships in Anaheim, California, McClure pulled off a highest preliminary score in the horizontal bar to give U.S. a second straight silver in the men's team all-around competition. His team received a composite score of 171.121, trailing China by nearly eight-tenths of a point (0.8).

2004 Summer Olympics

McClure competed for the United States at the 2004 Summer Olympics in Athens by earning a spot in the men's gymnastics team from the Olympic trials in Boston. On the first day of the Games, McClure joined with his teammate Paul Hamm in the individual all-around final from the prelim stage, finishing nineteenth with an entry score of 56.323. In the team all-around, McClure ended a 20-year-old drought to capture a silver for the U.S. men's best medal finish, joining on top of the podium by Jason Gatson, Paul Hamm, Morgan Hamm, Blaine Wilson, and Guard Young. During the competition, McClure performed a pommel horse (9.650) and horizontal bar (9.412) to sum up the team's total to 172.933, trailing Japan by almost a full point. In his final event, the individual all-around, McClure finished outside the medals in ninth place with a score of 57.248, just six-tenths of a point behind his teammate Hamm.

Life after gymnastics
On May 25, 2006, McClure announced his retirement from competitive gymnastics to pursue other opportunities and spend time with his family in Colorado. He was later named assistant coach of the Air Force Falcons gymnastics team at the United States Air Force Academy near Colorado Springs, Colorado. In June 2013 he took a coaching position at UC Berkeley for Cal Men's Gymnastics team. In 2015, he led the Bears to their first appearance in NCAA team finals since 2012.  As of May 1, 2017, McClure has taken on the role of High Performance Director with USA men's gymnastics.

References

External links
 
 
 
 Olympic Profile – Seattle Post-Intelligencer
 
 

1981 births
Living people
American male artistic gymnasts
Gymnasts at the 2004 Summer Olympics
Olympic silver medalists for the United States in gymnastics
Medalists at the 2004 Summer Olympics
Sportspeople from Yakima, Washington
Medalists at the World Artistic Gymnastics Championships
People from Mill Creek, Washington
Goodwill Games medalists in gymnastics
Competitors at the 2001 Goodwill Games